Comet McNaught can refer to any one of more than 50 comets discovered by the astronomer Robert H. McNaught.

Long-period and single-apparition comets
 C/1987 U3
 C/2005 E2
 C/2005 L2
 C/2005 L3
 C/2005 S4
 C/2006 B1
 C/2006 E1
 C/2006 K1
 C/2006 K3
 C/2006 L2
 C/2006 P1, also known as the "Great Comet of 2007".
 C/2006 Q1
 C/2007 K6
 C/2007 M1
 C/2007 P1
 C/2007 T1
 C/2007 Y2
 C/2008 A1
 C/2008 J4
 C/2009 F2
 C/2009 F4
 C/2009 F5
 C/2009 K5
 C/2009 R1
 C/2009 T1
 C/2010 J2
 C/2011 C1
 C/2011 G1
 C/2011 L2
 C/2011 L3
 C/2011 N2

Short-period comets
 191P/McNaught
 220P/McNaught
 320P/McNaught (formerly P/2004 R1)
 P/2005 J1
 P/2005 K3
 P/2005 L1
 P/2005 Y2
 P/2006 G1
 P/2006 H1
 P/2006 K2
 P/2007 H1
 P/2008 J3
 P/2008 O2
 P/2008 Y3
 P/2009 Q5
 P/2009 S2
 P/2009 U4
 P/2010 J5
 P/2010 T1
 P/2011 L1

Others
"Comet McNaught" may also be an incomplete reference to a comet co-discovered by Robert McNaught. These include:
 Comet 319P/Catalina-McNaught (P/Catalina-McNaught 2008 S1, 2008 JK)
 P/McNaught-Hartley (P/1994 N2, 1994 XXXI, 1994n)
 Comet McNaught-Hartley (C/1999 T1)
 Comet McNaught-Hughes, either of:
 C/1990 M1 (1991 III, 1990g)
 130P/McNaught-Hughes (130P/1991 S1, 1991 IX, 1991y, 130P/1997 H1)
 Comet McNaught-Russell, any of:
 C/1991 C3 (1990 XIX, 1991g)
 C/1991 Q1 (1992 XI, 1991v)
 C/1991 R1 (1990 XXII, 1991w)
 C/1993 Y1 (1994 XI, 1993v)
 P/1994 X1 (1994 XXIV, 1994u)
 Comet McNaught-Tritton (C/1978 G2, 1978 XXVII)
 Comet McNaught-Watson (C/1999 S2)